Crime Library was a website documenting major crimes, criminals, trials, forensics, and criminal profiling from books. It was founded in 1998 and was most recently owned by truTV, a cable TV network that is part of Time Warner's Turner Broadcasting System. In August 2014, Crime Library was no longer being updated. In February 2015 the site was taken offline.

Content 

Crime Library contained an extensive collection of crime related articles, which were separated into categories: Serial Killers, Notorious Murders, Criminal Mind, Terrorists & Spies and Gangsters & Outlaws. Each category was then broken down into further subcategories. For example, within Serial Killers were the subcategories Most Notorious, Sexual Predators, Truly Weird & Shocking, Unsolved Cases, Partners in Crime and Killers from History. Crime Library also featured photo galleries. These may have had anywhere from 10 to upwards of 100 slides. Some photo galleries were focused on a specific case, while others were lists of crimes linked by a theme (e.g., "Baby for Sale," cases where a person was arrested for allegedly attempting to sell his or her child), or collections of unusual booking photos.

High-profile crimes in the United States were prominent on Crime Library, but the site also contained information about historically notorious characters from various countries, including United Kingdom, Australia and France.

All articles on Crime Library were written exclusively for Crime Library by dozens of commissioned writers, many of them true-crime authors, including Chuck Hustmyre, Katherine Ramsland, Gary C. King and Anthony Bruno.

Crime Library maintained social media features where readers could interact and discuss criminal cases, including a Facebook page, a Twitter account and message boards.

History 

Crime Library was founded by Marilyn J. Bardsley in January 1998. Court TV, later truTV, purchased Crime Library in 2001, the same year The Smoking Gun was acquired by Court TV. Originally "The Crime Library," the name of the site was shortened to Crime Library in 2003 to accompany a redesign that changed the site's color scheme and layout.

Crime Library was managed by editor-in-chief Andy Brooks and managing editors Nastacia Leshchinskaya and Cora Van Olson.

As of August 2014, Crime Library was no longer providing updates on their website. As of 2015, the site is no longer accessible, but its content can be read at the Wayback archive of the site.

As of 2022, the website is accessible again under a new URL.

References

External links 
 Internet Archive Wayback Machine: Crime Library
 Behind Crime Library, Personal Pain and True Horror
 Inside Crime Library's collection of the worst crimes in history

Law enforcement websites
Online databases
Internet properties established in 1998
Internet properties disestablished in 2015